Tough Love: New Orleans (season 5) is the fifth season of the American reality television series Tough Love, which first aired on VH1. The show features eight women seeking relationship advice from the host and matchmaker, Steven Ward, and his mother JoAnn Ward, both of the Philadelphia-based Master Matchmakers. This season, Tough Love takes place in New Orleans, Louisiana.

Boot Campers

Episode Progress

In Episode 1, Steve revealed to the girls that this season, there is a "three strikes" rule. If the woman is in the hot seat three times, she must leave.

 The contestant had the best progress/date of the week
 The contestant was commended for good progress/date
 The contestant had average progress/date
 The contestant had poor progress/date
 The contestant had the worst progress/date of the week and was in the hot seat.
 The contestant voluntarily left the show.
 The contestant was ejected from boot camp after it was learned she was married and the mother of three children.
 The contestant had good progress and was in the hot seat.

References

External sources
 MasterMatchmakers.com

2012 American television seasons
VH1 original programming
2010s American reality television series
Television shows set in New Orleans